This article shows a list of flags of the Luftwaffe (1933–1945) which were used in the years between 1933 and 1945 by the German Luftwaffe. Most are based on the Prussian Infantry Regimental flags.

Supreme Commander of the Luftwaffe
Since the beginning of the German Luftwaffe, Hermann Göring was its designated head. In 1933 he was called Reichsminister der Luftfahrt (Reich Minister for Aviation), when on 26 February 1935, he was instituted as Commander-in-Chief of the German Luftwaffe. He held this title until April 1945, when he was banned by Adolf Hitler and replaced by Robert Ritter von Greim.

Other rank and command flags

Literature

References

Flags
Luftwaffe
Luftwaffe flags
Luftwaffe